Cyanuric fluoride or 2,4,6-trifluoro-1,3,5-triazine is a chemical compound with the formula (CNF)3. It is a 
colourless, pungent liquid. It has been used as a precursor for fibre-reactive dyes, as a specific reagent for tyrosine residues in enzymes, and as a fluorinating agent.

It is classified as an extremely hazardous substance in the United States as defined in Section 302 of the U.S. Emergency Planning and Community Right-to-Know Act (42 U.S.C. 11002), and is subject to strict reporting requirements by facilities which produce, store, or use it in significant quantities.

Preparation and reactions

Cyanuric fluoride is prepared by fluorinating cyanuric chloride. The fluorinating agent may be SbF3Cl2, KSO2F, or NaF.

Cyanuric fluoride is used for the mild and direct conversion of carboxylic acids to acyl fluorides:

Other fluorinating methods are less direct and may be incompatible with some functional groups.

Cyanuric fluoride hydrolyses easily to cyanuric acid and it reacts more readily with nucleophiles than cyanuric chloride. Pyrolysis of cyanuric fluoride at 1300 °C is a way to prepare cyanogen fluoride:
(CNF)3 → 3 CNF.

References

Fluoroarenes
Triazines
Fluorinating agents